The Roman Catholic Diocese of Metuchen is a Roman Catholic diocese in New Jersey, centered in the borough of Metuchen. It was established on November 19, 1981, from the territory of the Diocese of Trenton. The diocese encompasses the New Jersey counties of Middlesex, Somerset, Hunterdon and Warren. The Bishop of Metuchen presides from the Saint Francis of Assisi Cathedral in Metuchen.

The diocese counts more than 600,000 Catholics within its purview, distributed across more than 90 parishes, ministered to by over 160 priests residing in the diocese, with 100 non-resident priests and 150 deacons assisting. Six hundred religious serve the schools and various organizations throughout the diocese.

History
On November 19, 2021, the Diocese of Metuchen began its year-long 40th anniversary celebration. It was four decades ago that Pope John Paul II, decided to create the Diocese of Metuchen. It was when the Diocese of Trenton completed its centennial celebration in 1981, that the pope carved out four counties - Middlesex, Somerset, Hunterdon and Warren - to create the Church's newest diocese. The year 1983 saw the development of the Diocesan Mission Statement. To serve the spiritual needs of the people in the new diocese, the campaign "Forward in Faith," was established. Today it is known as the Bishop's Annual Appeal. 

During its first decade, the Church of Metuchen added new parishes in Perth Amboy, Califon, Skillman, Old Bridge and Three Bridges, and 11 new church buildings were erected. To welcome new members into the Catholic faith and meet the needs of new immigrants to the United States, the Office of Evangelization was established. The First Eucharistic Procession was held, as well as the first Respect Life Mass to honor anti-abortion advocates. At the end of the decade, the Life Chain was established to protest abortion. All three continue today.

At the beginning of its second decade, the Diocese of Metuchen celebrated its 10th Anniversary by awarding its first Regina Nostra medals to outstanding lay leaders. Since then, several hundred men and women have received this honor on significant diocesan anniversaries.

On Feb. 29, 1996, the first issue of "The Catholic Spirit," the diocese's official newspaper was published. Over the past 25 years, the paper has served to inform its readers about the important issues facing the Church and the diocese and relate stories about how individuals witness their faith and inspirational columns.

To increase the visibility and accessibility of the diocese, in February 1998, a diocesan website was launched. It was a tool which enabled the diocese to reach out to Catholics to inform them of the services and ministries available. In the ensuing years, the website was updated and expanded and today is a valuable resource for catechesis, community, and communication. 

To position the diocese and its many outreaches for the 21st century, in September 1999, the diocese launched a diocesan capital campaign, "In Service to the Kingdom."

In September 2001, a groundbreaking took place for the diocese's first Catholic school building in Hunterdon County. That year, Immaculate Conception School in Annandale, opened for students in pre-K through fourth grade. The following school year, with the completion of its new school building, the school expanded enrollment through eighth grade. 

During its first two decades, some of the Diocese of Metuchen's administrative offices were housed in a building in Iselin and many were scattered throughout the diocese. At the end of November 2001, however, that situation changed completely with the dedication of the diocese's St. John Neumann Pastoral Center in Piscataway.

The center was created through a two year renovation of the diocese's St. Pius X High School which had previously closed and was only used periodically for workshops and programs. With its opening, the center provided ample room for offices and ministries and had a chapel plus a large conference room. 

Beginning in January 2002, a major challenge faced the diocese with news of clergy sexual abuse. Immediately addressing the crisis, the diocese reviewed all clergy files, and in 2003, the bishop established the Office of Child and Youth Protection, and the Protecting God's Children program was implemented.

The diocese's Annual Blue Mass, which is still held, was re-established in 2003. Two years later the Diocesan Youth Day was established, a full-time vocations director appointed, and the House of Discernment for men considering the priesthood opened. At the end of 2005, the diocese began the celebration of its 25th Anniversary. During 2006, the diocese's first Synod was launched, papal and diocesan honors bestowed and pilgrimages held.

To help increase vocations, in 2008 more than 2,000 pilgrims traveled to the National Shrine of the Immaculate Conception in Washington, D.C. Then in January 2010, a new Catholic Center at Rutgers opened for more than 13,000 Catholic students.

Sexual abuse
On September 26, 2018, the United States Conference of Catholic Bishops announced an investigation of sexual abuse in the Diocese of Metuchen and three other dioceses American dioceses in which Theodore McCarrick, formerly a cardinal and the first bishop of the diocese, had served.

On February 13, 2019, all of the Catholic Dioceses based in New Jersey released the names of clergy who had been credibly accused of sexually abusing children since 1940. Of the 188 listed, 11 were based in the Diocese of Metuchen. Cardinal Joseph Tobin, Archbishop of Newark and metropolitan of the ecclesiastical province to which the Diocese of Metuchen belongs, also acknowledged that the alleged acts of abuse committed by the clergy in the list had been reported to law enforcement agencies.

In December 2019, a new law allowing for more victims of sexual abuse to file lawsuits took effect. As a result, McCarrick and convicted priest Romano Ferrero were named in separate lawsuits filed against the Diocese of Metuchen. Ferraro was laicized by the Vatican and is serving a life sentence in prison. In his lawsuit, James Grien, one of McCarrick's alleged New York victims, accused the Diocese of Metuchen of committing gross negligence by allowing McCarrick, who Grien claimed was a friend of his family, to sexually abuse him after he moved to the area as an adult.

By 2020, the names of 18 accused clergy who served in the Diocese of Metuchen had become public. On February 9, 2020, it was reported that all five Catholic dioceses across the state of New Jersey, which includes the Diocese of Metuchen, had paid over $11 million to compensate 105 claims of sexual abuse committed by Catholic clergy. Of these 105 claims, 98 were compensated through settlements. The payments did not involve 459 additional cases of sexual abuse in these dioceses which remained unresolved. The same month, it became public that the Diocese of Metuchen had worked with the Archdiocese of Newark and Diocese of Trenton in a scheme which involved secretly paying victims of McCarrick since 2005.

On July 23, 2020, it was revealed that, in a new lawsuit which had been against the Diocese of Metuchen, Archdiocese of Newark and Catholic schools, an alleged victim claimed that McCarrick owned a beach house which had served as common place that priests and others under the control of McCarrick engaged in “open and obvious criminal sexual conduct” that was kept cloaked by the church. Though it did claim whether or not McCarrick asked the other priests to bring boys to the beach house, the lawsuit did also that allege that some of his priests served as “procurers” who agreed to bring victims to McCarrick when he was Bishop of Metuchen. The alleged victim, who attended a Catholic school belonging to the Archdiocese of Newark, maintained that McCarrick abused him with the assistance of other priests beginning in 1982 when he was 14.  The lawsuit stated that boys were assigned different rooms in the house and paired with adult clergymen. The lawsuit also named three other priests of the Diocese of Metuchen as sexual abusers.

On September 8, 2020, it was revealed that a new lawsuit against McCarrick alleged he had a second beach house which he also used as a sex ring. At some point, McCarrick sold the beach house to the Diocese of Metuchen. However, the beach house was eventually sold to the Archdiocese of Newark in 1997. This came after the Archdiocese, where McCarrick was at this point serving as Archbishop, purchased the other beach house from the Diocese of Metuchen. The Archdiocese would sell this beach house just four months after purchase of the other beach house.

On September 9, 2020, it was revealed that two new lawsuits for sexual abuse against the Diocese of Metuchen named two priests who the Diocese of Metuchen had not included in the previous list as sex abusers. On December 1, 2020, it was revealed that the Diocese of Metuchen was among more than 230 sex abuse lawsuits filed within a period of one year against New Jersey Catholic Dioceses.

Facts about the Diocese of Metuchen 

 Formation of the Diocese - Nov. 19, 1981
 Counties - Middlesex, Somerset, Hunterdon and Warren
 Population - Estimated Number of Catholics - 620,438
 Households - 134,349
 Overall Population - 1,410,087
 Parishes - 90 (there are 15 Eastern Church parishes under the jurisdiction of their own bishops)
 Schools - 27 (23 Elementary; 4 High Schools)
 Catholic School Enrollment - 6,962 (2020)
 Religious Education Enrollment - 18,725 (2020)

Personnel 

 Priests - 221 (169 Diocesan; 16 Extern; 36 Religious)
 Seminarians - 22
 Permanent Deacons - 159
 Women Religious - 208
 Men Religious - 8

Reception into the Church (12/31/2020) 

 Baptisms - 2,288
 First Communions - 3,440
 Confirmations - 3,856
 Marriages - 441
 RCIA Candidates - 260

Healthcare & Social Institutions 
Hospitals - 1 - Saint Peter's University Hospital, New Brunswick, A member of the Saint Peter's Healthcare System
Health Care Clinics - 4
Day Care and Extended Care - 1
Homes for the Aged, Chronically Ill and Handicapped - 5
Half-way Homes - 5
Social Service Centers - 9

Ecclesiastical province

Coat of Arms
The blazon of the coat of arms, shown in the right sidebar at the top of this article, is Quarterly, Or and Argent, in dexter chief a tongue of fire Gules; in sinister base the letter "M" Azure, crowned Argent; overall a cross Moline Azure. The cross is taken from the coat arms of the See of Trenton from which the diocese was formed.  The tongue of fire refers both to "metachen," Lenni Lenape for firewood, and the descent of the Holy Spirit.  The crowned "M" refers to the queenship of the Blessed Virgin Mary, the principal patroness of the diocese, and also appears on the arms of Theodore McCarrick, the first bishop of the diocese, and Pope John Paul II, the pope who erected it. Its four quarters represent the four counties spanned by the diocese.

See also
List of the Catholic cathedrals of the United States
List of the Catholic dioceses of the United States
Plenary Councils of Baltimore
Roman Catholicism in the United States
Catholicism and American politics
History of Roman Catholicism in the United States

References

External links
Roman Catholic Diocese of Metuchen Official Site
Synodal home page
New Jersey Provincial Directory website

 
Metuchen, New Jersey
Metuchen
Metuchen
Metuchen
1981 establishments in New Jersey